Pride is an unincorporated community in Ross County, in the U.S. state of Ohio.

History
A post office called Pride was established in 1891, and remained in operation until 1929. Besides the post office, Pride had a large orchard called the Pride Fruit Farm.

References

Unincorporated communities in Ross County, Ohio
Unincorporated communities in Ohio